In computers, a serial decimal numeric representation is one in which ten bits are reserved for each digit, with a different bit turned on depending on which of the ten possible digits is intended. ENIAC and CALDIC used this representation.

See also
Bit-serial architecture
Digit-serial architecture
1-of-10 code
One-hot code

References

Computer arithmetic